Motorbase Performance is a British motor racing team, founded in 2004 by former Production Saloon racer David Bartrum. They are best known for competing in the British Touring Car Championship.

Porsche Carrera Cup Great Britain
The team started out by contesting the 2004 Porsche Carrera Cup Great Britain, finishing second in the teams championship despite their best-known driver Damien Faulkner only joining mid-season. However, the 2005 season proved difficult with no wins and poor points performance.

2006 saw the team enter both the Pro class and the newly established Pro-Am class. The team's main charge came from the 1992 BTCC champion Tim Harvey, who managed to score 3 wins on his way to second place in that year's championship. In the 2007 Porsche Carrera Cup Great Britain, Steven Kane won more races than anyone else, finishing 3rd overall.

The team took a break form the Carrera Cup in 2008 to focus on their British Touring Car Championship campaign but were back for the 2009 Porsche Carrera Cup Great Britain entering all three classes. Michael Caine was able to take 3 wins for the team during the year on his way to 4th in the championship.

2010 saw Michael Caine lead Motorbase's charge for the title gaining 7 wins along the way. However, he was beaten by 10 points to the title by ex-Motorbase driver Tim Harvey. In 2011, Harvey attempted to defend his title with Motorbase, partnering his rival Caine. However, the championship was won by James Sutton.

In 2011 the partnership of Caine & Harvey gave the team two very experienced drivers alongside Kieran Vernon and George Richardson, who stepped up to the Pro-Am 1 category and Steve Parish, who made a return to the Pro- Am 1 category, joined by new Italian team-mate Daniele Perfetti.

Harvey would later claim an outstanding victory for the team in the GB element of the Porsche Carrera World Cup race, racing against over 100 911 GT3 Cup cars from the worldwide Carrera Cup series racing on the daunting 14 mile world famous Nurburgring Nordschleife in Germany.

Later on in the season Caine amoved from the Motorbase Porsche Carrera Cup squad – but rather than stepping away, it was a move that would see him achieve a life-long ambition of joining the ranks of the BTCC.

Keen to fill Caine’s recently vacated seat, Team Principal David Bartrum pulled off an ambitious move by drafting in Nick Tandy -one of the most successful drivers in the Porsche Mobil1 Supercup and soon to be crowned 2011 Carrera Cup Germany Champion for the final two rounds. In return Tandy produced a stunning debut performance; setting a blistering pace of over half a second ahead of the field and rewarded the team’s hard work by racing to victory in three of the four remaining races of the season.

2018 also marked a return to the Porsche Carrera Cup GB grid for Motorbase, following a six year absence. After initially joining the championship in 2004, David Bartrum’s team competed at the very top of the German marque series for seven seasons, securing the Teams’ Championship title with a four-car strong squad in 2010 and amassing an impressive 26 race wins.

Starting the season as a single-car entry with 22-year-old rookie, Dan Vaughan, the team made an early impact, with Vaughan taking three Pro-Am wins and 5 podiums to end his impressive debut season as the Pro-Am runner-up – just 7 points adrift of the title.

A one-off appearance from Frenchman Valentine Hass-Clot at Silverstone at Snetterton, set the championship alight with a blistering performance that saw him charge from 7th to 2nd on the opening lap, with Motorbase collecting the ‘team of the weekend’ award from Porsche.

With the Carrera Cup GB celebrating its 300th race during the season finale weekend at Brands Hatch, David Bartrum commissioned a one-off special livery Porsche 911 Cup Car for the final rounds, drafting in Motorbase and Carrera Cup stalwart Michael Caine to run under the #300. The one-off livery attracted huge attention by both press and fans alike, with the car roof featuring all previous Carrera Cup GB race winners.

The team returned in 2019 running a two car Pro class programme in Porsche Carrera Cup GB for Dan Vaughan and Lewis Plato.

Plato endured a strong run recording eight podiums to secure fourth in the standings while Vaughan claimed sixth in the championship.

Porsche Carrera Cup GB results

British Touring Car Championship

Honda Integra (2006)
For 2006 they entered the BTCC for the first time, running a BTC Touring spec Honda Integra Type R owned and raced by David Pinkney. He scored a podium at Knockhill, three further top-five finishes, and 13th place overall.

SEAT Toledo (2006–2007)
For 2007 the team purchased two ex-works, S2000 specification SEAT Toledo cars, debuting one in the final round of the 2006 British Touring Car Championship season, driven by Tom Ferrier. For 2007 they entered Gareth Howell and rookie Matt Allison, showing pace but having regular accidents, skipping the Knockhill meeting after the carnage of Brands Hatch saw both cars written off. Howell left midseason, replaced by Ferrier, while Paul O'Neill joined Allison for the final round.

BMW 320si E90 (2008–2010)

For 2008 the BTCC cars were replaced by factory-specification BMW 320si E90, driven by Steven Kane and Rob Collard. The team entered no other championships for the season. After a slow start to the season (not helped by several wet-dry races which did not suit the rear-wheel-drive BMWs), Collard scored 2 top-5 finishes at Croft in round 5. This was followed by a 2nd-place finish for Kane at Snetterton.

2009 saw Kane replaced by young Scottish driver Jonathan Adam, who had previously won back to back titles in the SEAT Cupra Championship. Due to new sponsorship with Airwaves, the team began running under the Airwaves BMW banner. 2009 proved a successful season, with Collard winning 2 races and the team finishing 4th in the teams championship.

For 2010, Collard moved to West Surrey Racing, while Motorbase brought in Mat Jackson to replace him. Kane returned to the team, replacing Adam. Together, they were able to take 2 wins and 11 podiums, leading to 4th place in the teams championship for two consecutive seasons.

Ford Focus (2011–present)

In 2011 the team raced as Airwaves Racing and ran a trio of Ford Focus STs, which were previously run by Team Aon the previous year. Although the chassis was built to the S2000 specification, the team used the turbo charged NGTC Engine. Mat Jackson stayed with the team for a second consecutive season and was joined by rookie Liam Griffin. At the Rockingham and Brands Hatch rounds, the team entered a third car for Porsche Carrera Cup frontrunner Michael Caine. However, he was replaced in the third car at Silverstone by two-time British Touring Car Champion, James Thompson.

In 2012 the team raced under the banner of Redstone Racing, and continued to race with the three Ford Focus STs. Mat Jackson yet again stayed with the team for a third consecutive season. Liam Griffin returned for his second consecutive season with the team. The pair were joined by former Renault Clio Cup racer, Árón Smith. After a fire in Griffin's S2000 Focus meant they were a car short Motorbase built their first car; a NGTC specification global Ford Focus ST Mk.III. This car won its first race at the Silverstone meeting in the hands of Mat Jackson.

For 2013 Airwaves returned as the main sponsor for the team. The team retained Mat Jackson and Árón Smith who both drove new NGTC turbocharged Focus ST MkIII while Liam Griffin continued with the team driving the older S2000 specification turbocharged Focus ST MkII.

David Bartrum pulled off the coup of the year in signing two-times champion Fabrizio Giovanardi as the lead driver for Airwaves Racing in 2014. Another new face in former F2 racer Jack Clarke also looked set to deliver some great results with Clarke piloting the striking lime green livery of Crabbie’s Ginger Beer running under the Crabbie’s Racing title. Mat Jackson’s return to the squad for his fifth season was remarkably only announced at the official championship media day – after a last minute deal was penned that morning.

With BTCC legend Giovanardi and star Jackson spearheading the squad’s assault on the 2014 Championship, all eyes were on Motorbase as serious title contenders. Frustratingly, it quickly became apparent that Giovanardi’s four year absence from the Championship had left too big a gap for the Italian to make up and he failed to deliver the expected results. Conversely Jackson enjoyed another superb season, finishing 4th in the overall Championship standings and runner up in the Independents.

The season also marked Motorbase’s most successful season to date, taking 4th place in the Overall Teams’ Championship whilst incredibly maintaining a 100% finishing record for the #6 Focus ST – the only car to have completed every lap of the racing season. Jack Clarke’s rookie BTCC season built solidly. From a slow start, the Crabbie’s-backed racer showed true class during the season and was rewarded with his maiden podium and Independent race win following a stunning drive in the season finale at Brands Hatch.

2014 also marked the end of an era for Motorbase Performance, with Wrigley’s Airwaves taking the decision to move away from motorsport and the Motorbase squad after six years of success. One of the most successful partnerships in the BTCC, the farewell was suitably commemorated at the squad’s home circuit, Brands Hatch – the circuit where the Airwaves brand had made its debut six years earlier.

The lead up to the 2015 season would prove to be the most challenging yet for Bartrum. With the loss of Wrigley’s Airwaves, a new title sponsor was in place for the Kent squad before a last minute change of direction saw them pull out just weeks ahead of the start of the season.

With new signing James Cole already announced and confirmed alongside the returning Mat Jackson and the squad mid-way through a joint Ford EcoBoost development programme with engine builders, Mountune, Team owner David Bartrum had to make the momentous and difficult decision to take a half year sabbatical from the BTCC.  With support and agreement from TOCA and the team’s technical partners, Motorbase pushed on with the EcoBoost project before making it highly anticipated return to the grid at Snetterton for the second half of the season.

The teams’ return was watched with interest and it soon became apparent that the new EcoBoost engine and chassis improvements had brought a new lease of life to the Focus ST. After a promising start at Snetterton and Knockhill, Mat Jackson was the man of the moment – taking a maiden BTCC qualifying pole for Motorbase at Rockingham – before making it 3 in a row with a repeat performance at Silverstone and Brands Hatch.

In an incredible final three race meetings Jackson and Motorbase took an unrivalled 4 outright race wins and 4 podium finishes – smashing lap records along the way. Cole also enjoyed his most successful BTCC results in three years – taking a career best 9th place finish at Silverstone, a day best remembered for Motorbase claiming pole position in all three BTCC races.

2016 would prove to be the best year to date for Motorbase Performance. The team made a huge signing with 2013 BTCC champion Andrew Jordan joining the squad alongside Jackson.

Back for this seventh consecutive season with the team, Mat Jackson was almost untouchable. Taking a joint-top number of race wins (5 outright) for the season, Jackson also led the most laps out of the 32-strong-grid in his #7 Focus ST. Jordan proved to be a welcome addition to the team and settled in well, taking his first win in over two years at Thruxton. With both drivers consistently on form Motorbase took an early lead in the Independent Teams Championship and already had an unassailable lead by the time the BTCC grid left Rockingham.

Heading into the season finale at the squad’s local Brands Hatch circuit, both Jackson and Jordan were still in contention for the overall drivers’ title. An action-packed race day delivered high drama for both with a heavy shunt ruling Jordan out of the title race whilst Jackson claimed his fifth outright win of the season – propelling him into 3rd overall – the highest placed Independent Driver and just 16 points off Championship winner, Gordon Shedden.

Celebrating a sensational double Independent Title win – taking both the Indy Teams’ and Drivers’ crowns in front of an elated home crowd marked a very special moment in Motorbase’s 10th Anniversary of competing in the BTCC. The weekend topped off Motorbase’s most successful BTCC campaign to date after an incredible year that saw Jackson and Jordan jointly amass an impressive tally of 7 outright race wins, 7 outright podiums, 15 Independent race wins and 21 Independent podiums in the mountune-powered Ford Focus STs.

For 2017, Motorbase Performance boss David Bartrum decided the time had come to focus all efforts on the Dunlop MSA British Touring Car Championship.

Soon after, the well-known consumer brand Shredded Wheat was confirmed as title sponsor for a multiple-year campaign and the Kent-based squad unveiled a three-car assault with Mat Jackson at the helm, joined by BTCC regular Martin Depper and rookie Luke Davenport.

With a renewed energy, the squad set off the season all guns blazing but the results failed to materialise with the three Team Shredded Wheat Racing with duo Ford Focus STs struggling against the competition. After a promising weekend at Oulton Park with newcomer Davenport claiming Jack Sears Trophy honours as the top scoring rookie of the weekend, disaster struck at the next meeting in North Yorkshire. During a wet qualifying session at Croft circuit, 24-year-old Davenport was involved in a season-ending accident and suffered life threatening injuries. Thankfully, following tremendous care from the TOCA safety team and staff at the James Cook hospital in Middlesbrough, he made a full recovery but a return to racing was off the cards.
 
Former Motorbase GT racer Rory Butcher was drafted in to replace the stricken driver for the final 4 meetings of the season, with the scot making his BTCC debut at his local circuit, Knockhill and his rousing performance was rewarded with two top ten finishes and the Jack Sears Trophy honours.

The second half of the season proved more fruitful for the Motorbase team, with Jackson taking 7 Independent race wins across the ten race meetings. After a challenging year, Team Shredded Wheat Racing with DUO eventually ended the 2017 BTCC season in 6th place overall in the Teams Championship and 3rd in the Independent Teams’ standings.

A huge coup saw Motorbase secure two well-known, front-running drivers for its 2018 BTCC line-up in the shape of Touring Car star Tom Chilton (straight off his hugely successful WTCC campaign) who was paired alongside Mat Jackson in the Team Shredded Wheat Racing with Gallagher Fords. 2016 BTCC runner-up Sam Tordoff was also added to the squad, making his highly-anticipated return to the series after a years’ sabbatical.

The new season also signalled the unveiling of the new Ford Focus RS machine, with the Motorbase outfit bringing the iconic RS badge back to the championship after a 25 year absence.  The Sierra Cosworth RS500 dominated the Championship during the late eighties, securing the former Class A title for Robb Gravett back in 1990.

A shock, last minute departure for Jackson just weeks before the start of the season opened the way for BTCC race winner James Cole to return to the Motorbase fold, with the trio set up as one of the strongest squad’s on the grid. Lining up against one of the most competitive grids ever seen in the BTCC, the season delivered mixed blessings for the team.

Tordoff’s unquestionable pace was rarely rewarded with the deserved results, with a series of unfortunate incidents marring the Yorkshireman’s successes. Although, a challenging season overall, the JCT-backed driver remained unmatched in qualifying – ending the season as the highest-placed qualifier over the year – with an average starting position of 6th. Also securing the Ford Focus RS maiden pole position at Rockingham (poignantly, the BTCC’s last-ever visit to the circuit) and leading a spectacular Motorbase 1-2 at the following round on the Silverstone National circuit.

Chilton’s debut Motorbase season was a huge success. Settling well into the team and the Focus RS,  the 13 times-race winner added yet another win to his tally, collecting a maiden victory for the Ford Focus RS at Knockhill along with 5 podiums, eventually ending the season 3rd in the Overall Championship standings, and as Runner-up in the Independent Standings.

Numerous top ten finishes for Cole delivered a steady stream of points and the Team Shredded Wheat Racing with Gallagher squad finished a credible 4th overall in the Teams Standings – as the highest-placed Independent Team – also claiming 2nd in the Independent Teams’ championship with the newly-developed Ford Focus RS marking a solid debut season with 2 Independent race wins and 11 podiums.

Motorbase continued to field three Ford Focus RS machines in 2019 but with a changed driver line-up.

Chilton was joined by former AmDTuning.com driver Ollie Jackson in a move that saw him return to Motorbase, having driven for the squad previously in the Porsche Carrera Cup UK.

Nicolas Hamilton, half brother of six-time Formula 1 world champion Lewis Hamilton, piloted the third car under the ROKiT Racing banner. 
Hamilton contested eight rounds before sponsorship issues saw him vacate the seat for the final two rounds at Silverstone and Brands Hatch GP, where Michael Caine took over the car, now featuring backing from Pro Alloy.

Chilton scored double podiums at the Brands Hatch opener before claiming a third and the team’s only outright win of the year at Croft. He finished 10th in the standings after snaring his fifth podium at the Brands Hatch finale.

Jackson scored seven top 10 finishes, with a best of fourth at Snetterton, on his way to 19th in the championship.

For 2020, the team embarked on a huge project in developing a brand new car using the latest Ford Focus ST Mk4 chassis.

Easily the squad’s biggest undertaking in terms of car design saw the team use CAD for the first time to construct its new contender.

Three new cars were built for the season driven by the returning Rory Butcher, Ollie Jackson and Andy Neate, who made his return to the BTCC full-time after an eight-year sabbatical.

The car made its debut in testing in February/March but did not race until August due to the Covid-19 pandemic delaying the start of the BTCC season.

It proved to be an instant success propelling Butcher to two podium finishes in the opening meeting at Donington Park.

Butcher would go on to take the next two pole positions in qualifying at Brands Hatch GP and Oulton Park.

Jackson also shone in the Focus scoring a second career BTCC podium with a third at Brands Hatch.

Oulton Park saw Butcher claim another two podiums, including the car’s maiden win in Race 1 at the Cheshire circuit.

Butcher went on to win the final race at Knockhill and take third in the final race at the following meeting in Thruxton, to put him firmly in the title race.

Silverstone however proved a bittersweet meeting for the team as Butcher, who claimed third in Race 1, was spun by Ash Sutton in Race 2 before suffering a huge airborne crash in Race 3, almost writing off the car.

In the same race as the Butcher crash, team-mate Jackson went on to record a famous win his first in the BTCC.

Jackson would go on to accrue another win at Snetterton while Butcher scored the team’s fifth win in the final race of the season at Brands Hatch Indy.

Motorbase scored 11 podiums in total to claim fourth in the team’s championship and second in the independent teams’ title race. Butcher secured fifth in the championship with Jackson in 12th.

Neate scored three points on his way to 23rd in the championship.

BTCC results

Other Championships/Series
In 2005 they contested the SEAT Cupra Championship and the GT3 class of the British GT Championship, running an assortment of drivers including Steven Kane, Tim Harvey and David Pinkney.

They also raced in British GTs in 2006 and ventured outside the UK for the first time, in selected rounds of the Le Mans Endurance Series.

A return to the British GT Championship in 2012 would prove a prudent move for team, as the Motorbase pairing of Michael Caine and Daniele Perfetti in the Porsche 997 GT3 produced some stunning race results lined up against strong competition (including ex-Motorbase drivers Tim Harvey and Jonny Adam) on the GT grid.

The title showdown came down to the last start/finish line of the season with five cars competing for the overall title heading into the finale at Donington Park. A dramatic end to the season saw the Motorbase team finish the final two hour endurance race in fourth place, clinching the British GT Title in only its first season back competing in the Championship.

In 2013 Michael Caine was once more welcomed back behind the wheel of the #1 Porsche 911 GT3R to defend his British GT Championship title; partnered by Porsche Carrera Cup GB Champion Ahmad Al Harthy under the new team name Oman Air Motorbase for the 2013 season.

This exciting driver pairing had unfortunate repercussions for the Oman Air Motorbase Team. A hefty 75 kg weight penalty had a massive impact on the pace of the 911 and the pair drove brilliantly taking two race wins and scoring points in all but one of the 10 races before heading to the season finale as outside contenders. Disappointingly, contact in the final race of the season knocked the #1 911 out of the race lead and the team had to settle for 5th in the overall championship.

The squad expanded its GT programme into Europe in 2014 with parallel programmes in the Blancpain Endurance Series and British GT Championship.

The partnership of Al Harthy and Caine returned for a second British GT campaign with former BTCC and Porsche Carrera Cup racer Stephen Jelley joining them for the squad’s maiden Blancpain run. Meanwhile young Scotsman Rory Butcher joined forces with veteran sports car racer John Hartshorne in the second Vantage GT3. Hartshorne’s place in the squad was short-lived however, with former BTCC racer Liam Griffin joining Butcher in the Vantage at Rockingham for the remainder of the season.

The move to the Aston Martin marque paid dividends for Motorbase in the British GT, with Bartrum’s squad reclaiming the overall Teams Championship title during a thrilling Donington Park finale. A historic result for the team as the first ever Omani-licensed entry and Championship win for the Oman Nation. An incredible final performance from Al Harthy and Caine saw the duo end the season as Vice Champions – narrowly missing out on the overall drivers’ honours.

Motorbase’s maiden Blancpain season was a baptism of fire! Competing against the world’s best factory-backed GT3 teams and racers – the Wrotham-based squad battled hard to take a season best 10th place finish at on its only UK visit of the season at Silverstone. The opening season was unfortunately marred by a series of on-track incidents and mechanical issues on the new Aston, but a top-7 qualifying position during the final round of the season at the Nurburgring showed the squad’s potential.

A new driver line-up beckoned for the GT squad in 2015 with 23-year-old Daniel Lloyd partnering Ahmad Al Harthy in the British GT Championship.

Also returning for a full season effort was the duo of Rory Butcher and Liam Griffin in the second Aston Martin.

A familiar face also made a one-off appearance in the British GT opening round with Mat Jackson pairing up with Phil Dryburgh for the opening two races. A great start to the season with an opening race win for Butcher and Griffin set the scene for the season and the pair enjoyed a fantastic year in the #8 Aston; surprising many by taking two race wins, they ended the season in fourth place overall.

A change in driver classification had a massive impact on Al Harthy and Lloyd with the pair slotted into the new GT3 Silver Cup Class. With new BOP regulations also coming into play, the duos’ season was placed on the back foot immediately. Despite the challenges facing them, Al Harthy and Lloyd enjoyed success with a well-earned podium finish at Rockingham on their way to claiming the Silver Cup title at the end of the season.

With a new look Blancpain Endurance Series line-up confirmed in Ahmad Al Harthy, Daniel Lloyd and Aston Martin works driver and former Motorbase BTCC driver Jonny Adam, David Bartrum’s squad was all set for its second European campaign. With a year of experience and knowledge of the Aston Martin V12 Vantage GT3 the squad came remarkably close to a podium finish at the blue-riband Total 24 hours of Spa. Pitted against the world’s leading GT3 teams in the Pro Class, the Wrotham-based team struggled against the might of the factory and manufacturer teams in the first half of the season, before a move to Pro-Am class was rewarded with a fantastic top ten finish for Ahmad Al Harthy, Rory Butcher and Stefan Mücke during the last race of the season on the world-famous Nurburgring.

2015 ended on a high note for Motorbase with the GT squad taking an impressive pole position and podium on its maiden appearance in the Gulf 12 hours race on the stunning Yas Marina Grand Prix circuit in December. The only Aston Martin on the grid, the Motorbase car piloted by Al Harthy and Aston Martin works drivers Jonny Adam and Darren Turner raced phenomenally well against top International talent to take third place overall.

2016 saw a reshuffle in the GT squad saw the return of Al Harthy. The Oman racer was this time joined by Motorbase favourite and Aston Martin works driver Jonny Adam and newcomer Devon Modell – all focussed on refining on the previous season’s performances in Europe competing in the Blancpain Endurance Cup. Motorbase also returned to the British GT grid with sportscar veteran Phil Dryburgh behind the wheel of the #8 Vantage GT3, partnered by young Scot, Ross Wylie.

The European campaign started well for the Blancpain squad with Modell, Adam and Al Harthy gelling in the Pro-Am class category. A top-four place finish during the opening round at Monza got the championship challenge off to an excellent start and was immediately followed up with a maiden Blancpain podium on home-soil at Silverstone. Just missing out on a second podium at Paul Ricard, the squad went into the blue riband 24 hours of Spa event in strong form. Unfortunately after leading the Pro-Am Class and overall race briefly, contact in the early hours saw the #44 Aston drop down the order and derailed the hopes of another podium finish.

Despite the final two rounds of the campaign failing to produce the deserved results, David Bartrum’s outfit fought back from adversity in the season finale to take fourth in the Pro-Am Championship standings – missing out on the third spot by just a single point.

2016 would be a season best forgotten for Motorbase in the British GT. A huge accident during the opening round at Brands Hatch totalled the squad’s #8 Vantage and despite an epic rebuild by the Motorbase crew to get back on track for the following round – the season failed to deliver any real high points for the team. Dryburgh and Wylie secured points in five of the nine rounds but disappointingly a lack of consistency and pace failed to secure the results requited to mount a successful challenge.

References

External links
 

British auto racing teams
Auto racing teams established in 2004
2004 establishments in England
Blancpain Endurance Series teams
British Touring Car Championship teams
British GT Championship teams
Porsche Carrera Cup Great Britain teams
European Le Mans Series teams
British racecar constructors